The Infiernito Caldera is a volcanic caldera located north of the Chinati Mountains in West Texas.

References 

Volcanoes of Texas
Oligocene calderas
Calderas of Texas